Albert Arthur "Titch" Edwards (20 August 1915 – 15 October 2002) was an Australian rules footballer who played for Fitzroy in the Victorian Football League (VFL).

Edwards, nicknamed Titch, played originally at Laygols before he arrived at Fitzroy in 1936. His appearances were limited and only in 1938 was he a regular in the side.

He became coach of Tasmanian club New Norfolk in 1947.

Later, Edwards joined the Fitzroy coaching staff and in the 1961 VFL season filled in as senior coach, due to the absence of Len Smith, steering the club to a win over Carlton.

References

External links

Holmesby, Russell and Main, Jim (2007). The Encyclopedia of AFL Footballers. 7th ed. Melbourne: Bas Publishing.
Notice of Titch Edwards' death

1915 births
2002 deaths
Australian rules footballers from Melbourne
Fitzroy Football Club players
Fitzroy Football Club coaches
New Norfolk Football Club players
New Norfolk Football Club coaches
People from Ascot Vale, Victoria